Joseph Berry (born 7 May 1974) is a coach and former Scotland international rugby league footballer who played as a  or  in the 1990s and 2000s. He played at club level for Dudley Hill (in Bradford), Keighley Cougars, Huddersfield Giants, Doncaster Dragons (Heritage № 820), Rochdale Hornets and the Batley Bulldogs. He has been Dewsbury Celtic ARLFC Under-15s assistant coach since June 2016.

Background
Joe Berry was born in Bradford, West Riding of Yorkshire, England.

Playing career
Joe Berry won 4 caps (plus 3 as substitute) for Scotland in 1998–2003 while at Huddersfield Giants, Doncaster, Rochdale Hornets, and Batley Bulldogs.

References

1974 births
Living people
Batley Bulldogs players
Bradford Dudley Hill players
Doncaster R.L.F.C. players
English rugby league coaches
English rugby league players
Huddersfield Giants players
Keighley Cougars players
Rochdale Hornets players
Rugby league second-rows
Rugby league players from Bradford
Rugby league props
Scotland national rugby league team players